Friedrichsthal is Saarland in Germany.

Friedrichsthal may also refer to:

Friedrichsthal, Thuringia, in Germany
Narsaq Kujalleq, in Greenland, formerly known as Friedrichsthal
Emanuel von Friedrichsthal (1809–1842), Austrian botanist and archaeologist